Erolzheim is a town in the district of Biberach in Baden-Württemberg in Germany.

Notables
 Willebold Held, imperial abbey of Rot an der Rot
 Karl Zenger (1838–1905), architect
 Erwin Biber (1905–1944), known as racer "Biberle"
 Johannes Hösle (1929–2017), romance studies and literary criticism scholar
 Max-Engelhardt von Kienlin (* 1934), farmer, forester, mountaineer and author
 Konstantin Maier (* 1949), Roman Catholic priest and church historian
 Stefan Speth (* 1971), film architect, concept designer Blade Runner 2049, The Martian
 Konstantin Gropper (* 1982), director of the music project Get Well Soon

References

Biberach (district)
Württemberg